The 2016–17 Somali First Division is the 44th season of top-tier football in Somalia. The season began on 18 November 2016 and concluded on 2 August 2017.

Standings

References

Football leagues in Somalia
Foo
Foo
Somalia